The men's 4 × 100 metres relay event at the 2010 Asian Games was held at the Aoti Main Stadium, Guangzhou, China on 23–26 November.

Schedule
All times are China Standard Time (UTC+08:00)

Records

Results
Legend
DNF — Did not finish
DSQ — Disqualified

Round 1
 Qualification: First 3 in each heat (Q) and the next 2 fastest (q) advance to the final.

Heat 1

Heat 2

Final 

 India originally finished 4th, but was later disqualified after IAAF announced that Suresh Sathya had tested positive for Nandrolone prior to the Asian Games.

References

Results

Athletics at the 2010 Asian Games
2010